Of the 7 Iowa incumbents, 5 were re-elected.

Iowa was reapportioned from 7 seats to 6, dividing the old 5th district around Des Moines between its neighbors. Its incumbent, Neal Smith, won again in the south-central Iowa 4th district.

See also 
 List of United States representatives from Iowa
 United States House of Representatives elections, 1972

1972
Iowa
1972 Iowa elections